Sudheer Kumar (born 20 April 1955), better known by his stage name Maniyanpilla Raju (Malayalam:മണിയൻപിള്ള രാജു), is an Indian actor and producer who works in Malayalam film industry. His debut film was Mohiniyaattam in 1976. He has played a variety of roles as a character actor, appearing in over 400 films. His stage name was derived from the character he played in the film Maniyanpilla Adhava Maniyanpilla (1981), his break-through role.

Early life
Raju was born as the youngest among four in 1955 to Shekharan Nair and Saraswati Amma at Thycaud, Trivandrum. He has two sisters, Ramani and Radha, and a brother Surendran. He had his primary education from Government Model Boys Higher Secondary School, Trivandrum. He did his pre-degree in Victory Tutorial College. He learned diploma in acting course during 1973–1975 from Adyar Film Institute, Madras (now Chennai).

Personal life
Maniyanpilla Raju married Indira in 1985, and the couple blessed with two sons, elder one is Sachin. Younger son Niranj made his debut in Renjith's Black Butterfly. He wrote a book titled Chirichum Chirippichum containing his memoirs in 2012. In 2019, he opened a restaurant Be @ Kiwizo in Kannur, which has Kerala's first robot servants.

Filmography

As an actor

Mohiniyattam (1976)
Light House (1976)
Chirikudukka (1976)
Neethipeedham (1977)
Aval Oru Devaalayam (1977)
Mudramothiram (1978) as Kuttappan
Jayikkaanaay Janichavan (1978) as Tharakan's sidekick
Kanalkattakal (1978) as Man at Mentalhospital
Kanyaka (1978)
Mattoru karnnan (1978)
Thiranottam (1978)
Maalika Paniyunnavar (1979) as Ouseph
 Theenalangal (1980) as Appu
Aaravam (1980)
Chaamaram (1980)
Chamayam (1981)
Theekkali (1981)
Maniyan Pilla Adhava Maniyan Pilla (1981) as Maniyan Pilla
Tharattu (1981)
Football (1982) as Shivankutty
Ithu Njangalude Katha (1982) as Santhosh
Ithiri Neram Othiri Karyam (1982) as Raghu
Bheeman (1982)
Kattile Pattu (1982) as Raju
Aasha(1982) as Sunil Kumar
Chiriyo Chiri (1982) as Santhosh
Prem Nazirine Kanmanilla (1983) as Kidnapper (II)
Prasnam Gurutharam (1983) as Raju
Oru Madapravinte Kadha (1983)
Mortuary (1983) as Jacob
Sesham kazhchayil (1983) 
Pinnilavu (1983) as Sreedharan
Koodevide? (1983) as Shankar
Onnanu Nammal (1984) as Hari
 Thathamme Poocha Poocha (1984)
18 April (1984)
Theere Pratheekshikkathe (1984) 
Koottinilamkili (1984) as Gopan
Ivide Thudangunnu (1984) as Peter
Itha Innu Muthal (1984) as 'Kailasam' Raju
Athirathram (1984) as Anthony
Ariyatha Veethikal (1984) as Soman
Arante Mulla Kochu Mulla (1984) as Rajappan
Adiyozhukkukal (1984) as Jayarajan
Akalathe Ambili (1985) as Maniyan
Vannu Kandu Keezhadakki (1985)
Angadikkappurathu (1985) as Vasu
Nokketha Doorathu Kannum Nattu (1985) as
Jeevante Jeevan (1985) as Prakash
Boeing Boeing (1985) as Kuttappan
Aram + Aram Kinnaram (1985)
Akkare Ninnoru Maran (1985) as Achuthan
Karimpin Poovinakkare (1985) (as Raju (V))
Yuvajanotsavam (1986) as Bhagaval Das
Nimishangal  (1986) as Johnychan
Ithramathram (1986) as Rajeevan
T.P. Balagopalan M.A. (1986) (as Raju (V)) as Bala's friend
Katturumbinum Kathukuthu(1986) as Babu
Ponnumkudathinu Pottu (1986)
Thalavattom (1986) as Joseph
Hello My Dear: Wrong Number (1986)
Dheem Thariktia Thom (1986)
Ayalvasi Oru Daridravasi (1986) as Vidyadharan
Mazha Peyyunnu Maddalam Kottunnu (1986)
Ellavarkkum Nanmakal (1987)
Sarvakalashala (1987) as Chakkara
P.C. 369 (1987) as Damodaran Pillai
January Oru Orma (1987) as Narayana Swamy
Ithrayum Kalam (1987) as Unni Nampoothiri
Vellanakalude Naadu (1988) as Gopi
Mukunthetta Sumitra Vilikkunnu (1988)
Ayitham (1988) as Thankamani
 Oru Muthassi Kadha (1988) as Abdu
Chitram (1988)
Aryan(1988)
Kudumba Puranam (1988) as Murali
Mahayanam (1989)
Kireedam (1989)
Adhipan (1989)
Vandanam (1989) as Advertising Boss
Season (1989) as Kanthi
NairSaab (1990)
Naaduvazhikal (1989) as Ravi
Kireedam (1989)
Nocturne indien (1989) (as Raju) as Les enfants – Le serveur du restaurant de Madras
Kadathanadan Ambadi (1990)
Aey Auto  (1990)
Maala Yogam (1990) as Sudhakaran
Kouthuka Varthakal (1990) as Murthy
His Highness Abdullah (1990) as Raja Raja Varma
Pavam Pavam Rajakumaran (1990)
Akkareakkareakkare (1990) as Gopi
No.20 Madras Mail (1990) as Hitchcock Kanjikuzhi
Ganamela (1991) as Kannan
Advaitham (1991) as Chithran Nampoothiri
Aakasha Kottayile Sultan (1991) as Murali
Anaswaram (1991)
Kizhakkan Pathrose (1992)
Kudumbasametham (1992)
Kallan Kappail Thanne (1992) as Jose Kurian
Aham (1992)
Vasudha (1992)
Johnywalker (1992)
Neelakurukkan(1992)
Thalasthanam (1992)
Ellarum Chollanu (1992)
Ayalathe Addeham (1992) as Achuthan Singh
Sthalathe Pradhana Payyans (1993) as Thankachan
Ekalavyan (1993) as Chandran Vallappuzha
Kudumbasneham (1993)
Chenkol (1993)
Butterflies (1993)
Paithrukam (1993)
Mafia (1993)
Devasuram (1993) as Bharathan
Ponthanmada (1994)
Rudraksham (1994) as Appu
Kudumba Visesham (1994) as Prasad
Commissioner (1994) as Gopinathan
CID Unnikrishnan B.A., B.Ed. (1994) as Prem Shankar
Minnaram (1994)
Cabinet (1994) as Razzak
 Simhavaalan Menon (1995)
Spadikam (1995) as Kunju Mohammad
 Rajakeeyam (1995) as Pushpangathan
Agni Devan (1995) as Potty
Aadyathe Kanmani (1995) as Dineshan Unnithan
Oru Abihibhashakante Case Diary (1995) as Unni Thampuran
Sathyabhaamaykkoru Pranayalekhanam (1996) as Shambu
Mahatma (1996)
Kala Pani (1996) as Nair
Aayiram Naavulla Ananthan (1996) as Madhavan
 Sayaamees Irattakal (1997)
Asuravamsam (1997) as Inspector
Chandralekha (1997)
Oru Yathramozhi (1997)
 Aaraam Thamburaan (1997)
Kannur (1997)
Bharatheeyam (1997)
Ullasappoonkattu (1997)
Lelam (1997) as Umman
Kottapurathe Koottukudumbam (1997) as Mahadevan
Janathipathyam (1997) as Abootty
 Aaraam Jaalakam (1998)
Poothiruvathira Ravil (1998)
Thirakalkkappuram (1998)
Anuragakottaram (1998)
Harikrishnans (1998)
F I R (1999)
Kannezhuthi Pottumthottu (1999)
Stalin Shivadas (1999) as Anto
Usthad (1999) as Advocate
Pallavur Devanarayanan (1999) as Manavedathan Nampoothiri
The Godman (1999) as Karippetti Marthandan
Sahayathrikakku Snehapoorvam (2000)
Kallukondoru Pennu (2000)
Narasimham (2000)
Swayamvarapanthal (2000)
Satyameva Jayate (2000)
Pilots (2000) as Venkidi
Sharja To Sharja (2001) as Sethu
Naranathu Thampuran (2001)
Ravaanaprabhu (2001) cameo
Suryachakram (2001)
Nariman (2001) as Moytheen
Thandavam (2002) as Pushpakumar
Chathurangam (2002) as Alex
Sahodaran Sahadevan (2003) as Balagopalan
Njan Salpperu Ramankutty (2003)
Leader (2003) as Sadasivan
Kottaram Vaidyan (2004) as Thirumukham Pillai
Vamanapuram Bus Route (2004) as Rajappan
Kerala House Udan Vilpanakku (2004) as Pisharadi
Udayam (2004)
Njaan Salperu Raman Kutty (2004) as Sankaran
Mayilattam (2004) as Swaminathan
Chandrolsavam (2005) as C.I. Sugathan
Rajamanikyam (2005) as Advocate
Anandabhadram (2005)
Prajapathi (2006) as Kumaran
The Don (2006) as Abdullah
Pothan Vava (2006) as Paulachan
Paranayakalam (2007)
Chotta Mumbai (2007) as Adv. Menon
Big B (2007) as Dr. Venu
Nasrani (2007) as Kunjachan
Akkare Ninnoru Sultan (2007)
Janmam (2007)
Pakalnakshathragal (2008)
Oneway Ticket (2008)
Malabar Wedding (2008)
Sound of Boot (2008)
Annan Thampi (2008)
Twenty:20 (2008)
Thalappavu (2008)
Red Chillies(2009)
 Perumaal (2009)
Kanmazha Peyyum Munpe (2009)
Ividam Swargamanu (2009)
Shudharil Shudhan(2009) as Kanaran
Dr Patient (2009)
Calendar (2009)
Duplicate(2009) as Devan
Kerala Cafe (2009)
Gulumal: The Escape (2009)
Plus Two (2010)
Happy Husbands (2010)
 Oru Naal Varum (2010)
Elsamma Enna Aankutty (2010)
Kudumbasree Travels (2011)
Ninnishtam Ennishtam (2011)
Arabim Ottakom P MAdhavan Nairum (2011)
Rathinirvedham (2011)
Innanu A Kalyanam (2011)
Vellaripravinte Changathi (2011)
Kunjettan (2011)
Sevenes (2011)
 Thalsamayam Oru Penkutty (2012) as Ayyappan
Da Thadiya (2012) – John Prakash (as the father of Sekhar Menon)
Simhasanam (2012)
Diamond Necklace (2012)
Ustad Hotel (2012)
Kunjaliyan (2012)
 Cobra: Kottayam Brothers
 Ardhanaari (2013)
Black Butterfly (2013)
Radio (2013)
Lokpal (2013)
 Second Innings (2013)
Tourist Home (2013)
Idukki Gold (2013) as Madan
Namboothiri Yuvavu @ 43 - 2013
 Samsaaram Aarogyathinu Haanikaram – 2014
 My Dear Mummy - 2014
 Thamarassery to Thailand - 2014
 Bad Boys - 2014
 Close Friends -2014
 Munnariyippu - 2014
 Rosappookkaalam - 2014
 Bangalore Days – 2014
 Tamar Padar - 2014
 Thinkal Muthal Velli Vare - 2015
 Premam – 2015
 Acha Dhin – 2015
 Oru Second Class Yathra - 2015
 Kanyaka Talkies - 2015
 Kukkiliyar - 2015
 Premam - 2016
 Pavada – 2016
 Ore Mukham – 2016
 Anuraga Karikkin Vellam - 2016
 Karinkunnam 6's - 2016
 Kochavva Paulo Ayyappa Coelho - 2016
 Sakhavu - 2017
 Comrade In America - 2017
 Pullikkaran Staraa - 2017
 Adam Joan - 2017
 Lavakusha - 2017
 Shikkari Shambhu - 2018
 Mohanlal - 2018
 Panchavarnathatha - 2018
 My Story - 2018
 Pathinettam Padi - 2019
 Finals - 2019
 Ganagandharvan - 2019
 Thelivu - 2019
 Viddikalude maash - 2021
 Varayan - 2022
 Poovan  - 2022
 Maheshum Marutiyum - 2023

As a producer

Hello My Dear Wrong Number (1985)
Vellanakalude Nadu (1988)
Aye Auto (1990)
Anaswaram (1991)
Kannezhuthi Pottum Thottu (1999)
Anandabhadram (2005)
Chotta Mumbai (2007)
Oru Naal Varum (2010)
Black Butterfly (2013)
Pavada (2016)
Panchavarnathatha (2018)
Finals (2019)
Maheshum Marutiyum (2023)

Television

As judge
Comedy Super Show (Flowers Tv)
Comedy Stars Plus (Asianet Plus)
Comedy Stars Season 2 (Asianet)
Comedy Stars (Asianet)

As host
Beautiful minds (YouTube) 
Laughing Villa (Surya TV)
 Malayali Durbar (Amrita TV)
Jambanum Thumbanum (Asianet Plus)

As actor
 Ettu Sundarikalum Njanum (Surya TV) 2004-2005
 Mahatma Gandhi Colony (Surya TV) 2007-2008
 Kadamattathu Kathanar (Asianet)- 2004-2005
 Sthree (Asianet) 1998-2000
 Laksharchana (Doordarshan) 1995-1996
Aarohanam (Kairali TV) 2013-2014
Akshayapatram (Asianet)- 2001-2002

References

External links
 Maniyanpilla Raju at MSI
 

Male actors from Thiruvananthapuram
Living people
1955 births
Male actors in Malayalam cinema
Malayalam film producers
20th-century Indian male actors
Male actors in Malayalam television
Indian male television actors
Indian male film actors
Film producers from Thiruvananthapuram